Ectopsocus californicus is a species of outer barklouse in the family Ectopsocidae. It is found in Australia, Central America, and North America.

References

External links

 

Ectopsocidae
Articles created by Qbugbot
Insects described in 1903